Anti-English sentiment or Anglophobia (from Latin Anglus "English" and Greek φόβος, phobos, "fear") means opposition to, dislike of, fear of, hatred of, or the oppression and persecution of England and/or English people. Generally, the term is sometimes used more loosely as a synonym for anti-British sentiment. Its opposite is Anglophilia.

Within the United Kingdom
British statesman and Prime Minister Benjamin Disraeli said that the proud English were sprung from "a horde of Baltic pirates who were never heard of in the greater annals of the world." In his essay "Notes on Nationalism", written in May 1945 and published in the first issue of the intellectual magazine Polemic (October 1945), George Orwell wrote that "Welsh, Irish and Scottish nationalism have points of difference but are alike in their anti-English orientation".

Scotland

A 2005 study by Hussain and Millar of the Department of Politics at the University of Glasgow examined the prevalence of Anglophobia in relation to Islamophobia in Scotland. One finding of the report suggested that national "phobias" have common roots independent of the nations they are directed towards. The study states that

The study goes on to say (of the English living in Scotland): "Few of the English (only 16 per cent) see conflict between Scots and English as even 'fairly serious'." Hussain and Millar's study found that Anglophobia was slightly less prevalent than Islamophobia but that unlike Islamophobia, Anglophobia correlated with a strong sense of Scottish identity.

In 1999 an inspector and race relations officer with Lothian and Borders Police said that a correlation had been noticed between the establishment of the Scottish Parliament and anti-English incidents. Hussain and Millar's research suggested that Anglophobia had fallen slightly since the introduction of devolution.

In 2009, a woman originally from England was assaulted in an allegedly anti-English racially motivated attack. Similar cases have been connected with football matches and tournaments, particularly international tournaments where the English and Scottish football teams often compete with each other. A spate of anti-English attacks occurred in 2006 during the FIFA World Cup. In one incident a 7-year-old boy wearing an England shirt was punched in the head in an Edinburgh park.

In 1998, 19 year-old apprentice mechanic Mark Ayton was punched to the ground and kicked to death by three youths. The father of the victim explicitly cited Ayton's English accent as a contributing factor in the attack.  Court proceedings recorded the fact that the attackers were singing 'Flower of Scotland' which includes the lines 'And sent them homeward, Tae think again'; an allusion about ridding Scotland of the English, immediately prior to the attack.  The attackers served less than a year in prison for the killing. 

In 2017, former Scottish Journalist of the Year Kevin McKenna penned an article in The National labelling English people living in Scotland as 'colonising wankers' .

In 2020, groups of Scottish Nationalists picketed the English border, airports and railway stations sporting hazmat suits and dogs intent on stopping English people from crossing the England-Scotland border. The Scottish Secretary Alistair Jack accused Scotland's First Minister Nicola Sturgeon of having incited the incident by inaccurately using Covid statistics to stoke anti-English sentiment

Wales

The Laws in Wales Acts 1535 and 1542, also known as the "Acts of Union", passed by the Parliament of England, annexed Wales to the Kingdom of England and replaced the Welsh language and Welsh law with the English language and English law. Section 20 of the 1535 Act made English the only language of the law courts and stated that those who used Welsh would not be appointed to any public office in Wales. The Welsh language was supplanted in many public spheres with the use of the Welsh Not in some schools. The Not, the use of which was never government policy, was later described as a symbol of English cultural oppression.

Since the Glyndŵr Rising of the early 15th century, Welsh nationalism has been primarily non-violent. The Welsh militant group Meibion Glyndŵr were responsible for arson attacks on English-owned second homes in Wales from 1979 to 1994, motivated by cultural anti-English sentiment. Meibion Glyndŵr also attempted arson against several estate agents in Wales and England and against the offices of the Conservative Party in London.

In 2000, the Chairman of Swansea Bay Race Equality Council said that "Devolution has brought a definite increase in anti-English behaviour" citing three women who believed that they were being discriminated against in their careers because they could not speak Welsh. In 2001 Dafydd Elis-Thomas, a former leader of Plaid Cymru, said that there was an anti-English strand to Welsh nationalism.

Northern Ireland
During the Troubles, the Irish Republican Army (IRA) mainly attacked targets in Northern Ireland and England, not Scotland or Wales, although the IRA planted a bomb at Sullom Voe Terminal in Shetland during a visit by the Queen in May 1981. The ancestry of most people in the Loyalist and Unionist communities is Scottish rather than English. In the Protestant community, the English are identified with British politicians and are sometimes resented for their perceived abandonment of loyalist communities.

Outside the United Kingdom

In his 1859 essay A Few Words on Non-Intervention, John Stuart Mill notes that England "finds itself, in respect of its foreign policy, held up to obloquy as the type of egoism and selfishness; as a nation which thinks of nothing but of out-witting and out-generalling its neighbours" and urges his fellow countrymen against "the mania of professing to act from meaner motives than those by which we are really actuated".

Australia and New Zealand

"Pommy" or "Pom" (probably derived from rhyming slang - pomegranate for immigrant) is a common Australasian and South African slang word for the English, often combined with "whing[e]ing" (complaining) to make the expression "whingeing Pom" – an English immigrant who stereotypically complains about everything. Although the term is sometimes applied to British immigrants generally, it is usually applied specifically to the English, by both Australians and New Zealanders. From the 19th century, there were feelings among established Australians that many immigrants from England were poorly skilled, unwanted by their home country and unappreciative of the benefits of their new country.

In recent years, complaints about two newspaper articles blaming English tourists for littering a local beach and called the English "Filthy Poms" in the headlines and "Poms fill the summer of our discontent", were accepted as complaints and settled through conciliation by the Australian Human Rights Commission when the newspapers published apologies. Letters and articles which referred to English people as "Poms" or "Pommies" did not meet the threshold for racial hatred. In 2007 a complaint to Australia's Advertising Standards Bureau about a television commercial using the term "Pom" was upheld and the commercial was withdrawn.

France

After the Norman conquest in 1066, Anglo-Norman French replaced Old English as the official language of England. In the thirteenth and fourteenth centuries, the Plantagenet kings of England lost most of their possessions in France, began to consider England to be their primary domain and turned to the English language. King Edward I, when issuing writs for summoning parliament in 1295, claimed that the King of France planned to invade England and extinguish the English language, "a truly detestable plan which may God avert". In 1346, Edward III exhibited in Parliament a forged ordinance, in which Philip VI of France would have called for the destruction of the English nation and country. The Hundred Years' War (1337–1453) between England and France changed societies on both sides of the Channel.

The English and French were engaged in numerous wars in the following centuries. England's conflict with Scotland provided France with an opportunity to destabilise England and there was a firm friendship (known as the Auld Alliance) between France and Scotland from the late-thirteenth century to the mid-sixteenth century. The alliance eventually foundered because of growing Protestantism in Scotland. Opposition to Protestantism became a major feature of later French Anglophobia (and conversely, fear of Catholicism was a hallmark of Francophobia). Antipathy and intermittent hostilities between France and Britain, as distinct from England, continued during later centuries.

Ireland 

There is a long tradition of Anglophobia within Irish nationalism. Much of this was grounded in the hostility felt by the largely Catholic Irish for the Anglo-Irish people, which was mainly Anglican. In Ireland before the Great Famine, anti-English hostility was deep-seated and was manifested in increased anti-English hostility organised by United Irishmen. In post-famine Ireland, anti-English hostility was adopted into the philosophy and foundation of the Irish nationalist movement. At the turn of the 20th century, the Celtic Revival movement associated the search for a cultural and national identity with an increasing anti-colonial and anti-English sentiment. Anti-English themes manifested in national organisations seen as promoting native Irish values, with the emergence of groups like Sinn Féin. One popular nationalist slogan was "England's difficulty is Ireland's opportunity" and the well-known anti-World-War-I song "Who is Ireland's Enemy?" used past events to conclude that it was England, and furthermore that Irish people ought to "pay those devils back".

The Gaelic Athletic Association (GAA) was founded in 1884 as a counter-measure against the Anglo-Irish Athletic Association, which promoted and supervised British sports such as English football in Ireland. The GAA was founded in the anti-English ideas of Thomas Croke, Archbishop of Cashel and Emly. From 1886 to 1971 the GAA focused national pride into distinctly non-English activities. Members were forbidden to belong to organisations that played "English" games and the organisation countered the Anglicisation in Irish society. With the development in Ireland of Irish games and the arts, the Celtic revivalists and nationalists identified characteristics of what they defined as the "Irish Race". A nationalistic identity developed, as the opposite of the Anglo-Saxons and untainted by the Anglo-Irish. A sense of national identity and Irish distinctiveness as well as an anti-English assertiveness was reinforced to Catholics by teachers in hedge schools.

A feeling of anti-English sentiment intensified within Irish nationalism during the Boer Wars, leading to xenophobia underlined by Anglophobia. Two units of Irish commandos fought with the Boer against British forces during the Second Boer War (1899–1902). J. Donnolly, a member of the brigade, wrote to the editor of the Irish News in 1901:

It was not for the love of the Boer we were fighting; it was for the hatred of the English. (J. Donnolly letter to the Irish News, 1901)

The pro-Boer movement gained widespread support in Ireland, and over 20,000 supporters demonstrated in Dublin in 1899 where Irish nationalism, anti-English and pro-Boer attitudes were one and the same. There was a pro-Boer movement in England as well but the English pro-Boer movement was not based on anti-English sentiments. These opposing views and animosity led the English and Irish pro-Boer groups to maintain a distance from one another. Despite this, far more Irishmen joined various Irish Regiments of the British Army during this time, more so than pro-Boer commandos.

The W. B. Yeats play The Countess Cathleen, written in 1892, has anti-English overtones comparing the English gentry to demons who come for Irish souls. Films set during the Irish War of Independence, such as The Informer (1935) and the Plough and the Stars (1936), were criticised by the BBFC for the director John Ford's anti-English content and in recent years, Michael Collins and The Wind That Shakes the Barley (despite being a joint British-Irish production) have led to accusations of Anglophobia in the British press. In 2006, Antony Booth, the father-in law of Tony Blair, claimed he was the victim of anti-English vandalism and discrimination while living in County Cavan, Ireland, with his wife. In August 2008 an English pipe fitter based in Dublin was awarded €20,000 for the racial abuse and discrimination he received at his workplace.

In 2011, tensions and anti-English or anti-British feelings flared in relation to the proposed visit of Queen Elizabeth II, the first British monarch to visit Ireland in 100 years. The invitation by the President of Ireland, Mary McAleese, and the Irish government, was hailed by the Irish press as a historic visit but was criticised by Sinn Féin President Gerry Adams. An anti-Queen demonstration was held at the GPO Dublin by a small group of Irish Republicans on 26 February 2011, and a mock trial and decapitation of an effigy of Queen Elizabeth II were carried out by socialist republican group Éirígí. Other protests included one Dublin publican (the father of Celtic player Anthony Stokes) hanging a banner declaring "the Queen will never be welcome in this country".

In the wake of the Brexit Referendum in the United Kingdom in 2016, numerous articles critical of English people have been published by The Irish Times, particularly by its drama critic Fintan O'Toole, who has described England as being unworthy of national self-determination and having made no distinctive contribution to world culture.

Russia

Despite having formed an alliance between two nations since Tsarist rule, due to the Great Game, a wave of widespread Anglophobia took hold in Russia, with the fear of English meddling and intervention. During the Russo-Japanese War, there was a sentiment in Russia that England was behind Japan's militarism against Russia in the Far East, strained relationship between Britain and Russia. These tensions temporarily settled following the World War I but it became tense when Britain was thought to have been hiding the lost gold reserve of the House of Romanov following the fall of the Russian Empire. Theories of British meddling continued to influence Russian society that the British government's secret relationship with Joseph Stalin toward the Great Purge. During the Cold War, Britain firmly sided with the West against the Soviet Union and the relationship between the two continues to remain dubious even today. Before 2018 FIFA World Cup, there had been controversies regarding Anglophobia in Russia.

Argentina

Anglophobia in Argentina has been studied by the historian Ema Cibotti in "Dear Enemies. From Beresford to Maradona, the true story of relations between the English and Argentines". In its prologue, entitled "Against the English it is better", the social historian states

That feeling has not been constant or unanimous. Characters such as Manuel Belgrano, who had faced the English invasions of Buenos Aires in 1806 and 1807 or Mariano Moreno, among the independence leaders, supported policies similar to those of the British and the dispute over the Falkland Islands did not sour relations. The 1929 crisis and the coup that overthrew Hipólito Yrigoyen in 1930, with the fall in export prices, will be the determining factors in the appearance of an Anglophobic sentiment linked to the rejection of neo-colonialism or British imperialism. This is what the Spanish pedagogue Lorenzo Luzuriaga observed upon arriving in Argentina in 1940, who in a letter to Américo Castro analysed the different attitudes towards the outbreak of the World War

Philosopher Mario Bunge, in an interview granted to Jorge Fontevecchia on May 4, 2008, collected in Reportajes 2, alluded to the spread of Anglophobic sentiment in the years of the conflict, explainable "because many of the companies had been owned by the English" and attributed to this feeling the approach to Nazism of Carlos Astrada, introducer of existentialist philosophy in Argentina. But it will be with the Falklands War in 1982 when Anglophobic sentiment spread to a good part of society.

See also

 Anglophile
 Anti-Canadian sentiment § Quebec - where anti-Anglophone sentiment is often described as Anglophobia
 List of phobias
 Perfidious Albion
 Views of Lyndon LaRouche and the LaRouche movement
 Stereotypes of the British

References

Further reading

France
 Acomb, Frances Dorothy. Anglophobia in France, 1763–1789: an essay in the history of constitutionalism and nationalism (Duke University Press, 1950)
 Bell, Philip J. France and Britain, 1900–1940. Entente and Estrangement (Longman, 1996)
 Berthon, Simon. Allies at War: The Bitter Rivalry among Churchill, Roosevelt, and de Gaulle (2001). 356 pp.
 Black, Jeremy. Natural and Necessary Enemies: Anglo-French Relations in the Eighteenth Century (1986)
 Brunschwig, Henri. Anglophobia and French African Policy (Yale University Press, 1971).
 Gibson, Robert. The Best of Enemies: Anglo-French Relations Since the Norman Conquest (2nd ed. 2011) major scholarly study excerpt and text search
 Horne, Alistair, Friend or Foe: An Anglo-Saxon History of France (Weidenfeld & Nicolson, 2005).
 Johnson, Douglas, et al.  Britain and France: Ten Centuries (1980) table of contents
 Newman, Gerald. "Anti-French Propaganda and British Liberal Nationalism in the Early Nineteenth Century: Suggestions Toward a General Interpretation." Victorian Studies (1975): 385–418. in JSTOR
 Otte, T. G. "From "War-in-Sight" to Nearly War: Anglo–French Relations in the Age of High Imperialism, 1875–1898." Diplomacy and Statecraft (2006) 17#4 pp: 693–714.
 Pickles, Dorothy. The Uneasy Entente. French Foreign Policy and Franco-British Misunderstandings (1966)
 Schmidt, H. D. "The Idea and Slogan of 'Perfidious Albion'" Journal of the History of Ideas (1953) pp: 604–616. in JSTOR; on French distrust of "Albion" (i.e. England)
 Tombs, R. P. and I. Tombs, That Sweet Enemy: Britain and France, the History of a Love-Hate Relationship (Pimlico, 2007)

Germany
 Frederick, Suzanne Y. "The Anglo-German Rivalry, 1890–1914," pp. 306–336 in William R. Thompson, ed. Great power rivalries (1999) online
  Geppert, Dominik, and Robert Gerwarth, eds. Wilhelmine Germany and Edwardian Britain: Essays on Cultural Affinity (2009)
 Görtemaker, Manfred. Britain and Germany in the Twentieth Century (2005)
 Hoerber, Thomas. "Prevail or perish: Anglo-German naval competition at the beginning of the twentieth century," European Security (2011) 20#1, pp. 65–79.
 Kennedy, Paul M. "Idealists and realists: British views of Germany, 1864–1939," Transactions of the Royal Historical Society 25 (1975) pp: 137–56; compares the views of idealists (pro-German) and realists (anti-German)
 Kennedy, Paul. The Rise of the Anglo-German Antagonism 1860–1914 (London, 1980) excerpt and text search; influential synthesis
 Major, Patrick. "Britain and Germany: A Love-Hate Relationship?" German History, October 2008, Vol. 26 Issue 4, pp. 457–468.
 Milton, Richard. Best of Enemies: Britain and Germany: 100 Years of Truth and Lies (2004), popular history covers 1845–1945 focusing on public opinion and propaganda; 368pp excerpt and text search
 Ramsden, John. Don’t Mention the War: The British and the Germans since 1890 (London, 2006).
 Rüger, Jan. "Revisiting the Anglo-German Antagonism," Journal of Modern History (2011) 83#3, pp. 579–617 in JSTOR
 Scully, Richard. British Images of Germany: Admiration, Antagonism, and Ambivalence, 1860–1914 (Palgrave Macmillan, 2012) 375pp

United States
 Cook, James G. Anglophobia: An Analysis of Anti-British Prejudice in the United States (1919) online
 Crapol, Edward P. America for Americans: Economic Nationalism and Anglophobia in the Late Nineteenth Century (Greenwood, 1973)
 Frost, Jennifer. "Dissent and Consent in the" Good War": Hedda Hopper, Hollywood Gossip, and World War II Isolationism." Film History: An International Journal 22#2 (2010): 170–181.
 Ellis, Sylvia. Historical Dictionary of Anglo-American Relations (2009) and text search
 Foreman, Amanda. A World on Fire: Britain’s Crucial Role in the American Civil War (Random House, 2011), 958 pp.
 Geoffrey Wheatcroft, "How the British Nearly Supported the Confederacy," New York Times Sunday Book Review June 30, 2011 online
 Gleason, Mark C. From Associates to Antagonists: The United States, Great Britain, the First World War, and the Origins of War Plan Red, 1914–1919 (PhD. Dissertation University of North Texas, 2012); Online; "War Plan Red" was the American Army's plan for war against Great Britain.
 Haynes, Sam W. Unfinished Revolution: The Early American Republic in a British World (2010)
 Louis, William Roger; Imperialism at Bay: The United States and the Decolonization of the British Empire, 1941–1945 (1978)
 Moser, John E. Twisting the Lion's Tail: American Anglophobia between the World Wars (New York University Press, 1999)
 Perkins, Bradford. Prologue to war: England and the United States, 1805–1812  (1961) full text online
 Peskin, Lawrence A. "Conspiratorial Anglophobia and the War of 1812." Journal of American History 98#3 (2011): 647–669. online
 Tuffnell, Stephen. ""Uncle Sam is to be Sacrificed": Anglophobia in Late Nineteenth-Century Politics and Culture." American Nineteenth Century History 12#1 (2011): 77–99.

Anglophobic publications
 Gelli, Frank Julian. The Dark Side of England, (London, 2014)

Anti-British sentiment
 Anti-English sentiment
Racism